Lady Daemyeong of the Jeongju Yu clan was a Goryeo Royal family member as both of paternal and maternal granddaughter of King Taejo who became the fifth wife of King Gyeongjong. Since married her first cousin, she then followed her grandmother's clan the Jeongju Yu. She had a brother whom didn't records too detailed. 

Although all of Gyeongjong's 1st-4th wife was posthumously honoured as a queen, just she who didn't receive any posthumous name. So, it was expected that even among the same royal family, there would be discrimination in treatment according to their families' status.

References

External links
Lady Daemyeong on Encykorea .

Royal consorts of the Goryeo Dynasty
Year of birth unknown
Year of death unknown
10th-century Korean people